Guemesia (named after Martín Miguel de Güemes, whose death bicentenary was in 2021) is a genus of abelisaurid dinosaur from the Late Cretaceous Los Blanquitos Formation of Salta Province, Argentina. The type and only species is Guemesia ochoai, known from a nearly complete braincase. It is one of the smallest abelisaurids currently known.

Discovery 
The holotype of Guemesia, IBIGEO-P 103, is a small, nearly complete braincase. It was found in the Los Blanquitos Formation, in the Amblayo Valley of Salta Province, Argentina. The specimen was described in 2022 by Agnolín et al. as belonging to a new genus and species of abelisaurid dinosaur, and the first dinosaur of its kind known from the area.

Classification 
Agnolín et al. place Guemesia as a derived abelisaurid within the clade Brachyrostra.

Paleoecology 
Guemesia is known from the Los Blanquitos Formation. The controversial tetanuran theropod Unquillosaurus is also known from this formation, as well as fossils of what may belong to a species of Titanosaurus.

References 

Late Cretaceous
Fossils of Argentina
Late Cretaceous dinosaurs of South America
 Campanian life
Brachyrostrans
Fossil taxa described in 2022
Cretaceous Argentina
Salta Basin